Haberlandia clenchi is a moth in the family Cossidae. It is found in the Democratic Republic of Congo. The habitat consists of a mosaic of open water, marshland, swamp forests, seasonally flooded forests and levee forests.

The wingspan is about 25 mm. The forewings are colonial buff with buffy olive lines from the costal margin towards the discocellular cell. The hindwings are glossy colonial buff with scattered buffy olive lines.

Etymology
The species is named in honour of Harry Kendon Clench.

References

Natural History Museum Lepidoptera generic names catalog

Moths described in 2011
Metarbelinae
Taxa named by Ingo Lehmann
Endemic fauna of the Democratic Republic of the Congo